Marlene Morreis (born 21 December 1976 in Schärding, Upper Austria, is an Austrian actress.

Life and career 
Marlene Morreis was born in 1976 in Schärding in Upper Austria. She attended a rural primary school, then she went to the grammar school and successfully completed her Matura (A Levels). She then began studying Nordic philology in Munich. After spending a year abroad in Linköping, Sweden and returning to Munich, she was hired by Klaus Lemke in 2002 as a student waitress and doorkeeper at The Atomic Café in Munich for a role in the feature film Running Out of Cool. She then performed on stage at the Munich Lustspielhaus and then took a six-month sabbatical in Alaska, where she worked in a bar.

In 2005, Morreis began her acting training at The New School for Drama in New York City, which she graduated in 2008 with a Master of Fine Arts.

From 2008, Morreis worked in numerous independent productions in the USA, until 2010 when her artist's visa for a leading role in an episode expired. So, in 2011, she returned to Munich. In the television series Schafkopf - A bissel was geht immer, which was broadcast on ZDF in November 2012, she played the starring role for the first time.

In 2015, she played the leading role in the four-part ZDF comedy series Komm schon!.  In 2020, Morreis starred alongside Hannelore Elsner in their last film Lang lebe die Königin ("Long Live the Queen") as her  daughter and TV host, Nina Just.

Marlene Morreis speaks High German, Bavarian and Austrian dialects. She is also fluent in American and in British English and in Swedish. She lives in Munich.

Filmography (selection) 
 2002: Running Out of Cool
 2009: The Greims
 2010: Hungry Henrieta
 2011: Stags
 2012: One Bedroom
 2012: Schafkopf – A bissel was geht immer (TV series, 6 episodes)
 2012: 
 2012: Kommissarin Lucas – Die sieben Gesichter der Furcht
 2012: Der Alte – Die Zeugin
 2012–2013: Schlawiner (TV series)
 2013: Wer hat Angst vorm weißen Mann?
 2013: Polizeiruf 110: Kinderparadies
 2014: Meine Mutter, meine Männer
 2014: Die Frau aus dem Moor
 2014: Die Rosenheim-Cops – a call centre under suspicion
 2015: Ein Sommer in Masuren
 2015: Komm schon! (TV series)
 2015–2020: Schwarzach 23 (film series)
 2015: Schwarzach 23 und die Hand des Todes
 2016: Schwarzach 23 und die Jagd nach dem Mordsfinger 
 2018: Schwarzach 23 und der Schädel des Saatans
 2020: Schwarzach 23 und das mörderische Ich
 2016: Unser Traum von Kanada: Sowas wie Familie
 2016: Der mit dem Schlag
 2015: Mein Schwiegervater, der Stinkstiefel
 2016: Heiter bis tödlich: München 7 (TV series)
 2016: Liebe bis in den Mord – an Alpine thriller
 2016: Polizeiruf 110: Sumpfgebiete
 2016: Inspektor Jury spielt Katz und Maus
 2016: Der mit dem Schlag
 2016: Hubert und Staller (TV series)
 2017: Der Bergdoktor
 2017: Jella jagt das Glück
 2017: Wenn Frauen ausziehen
 2017: Tatort: Die Liebe, ein seltsames Spiel
 2018: Matula – Der Schatten des Berges
 2018: Wackersdorf
 2018: Die Chefin – a village beauty
 2018: Labaule & Erben
 2019: Curling for Eisenstadt
 2020: Lang lebe die Königin
 2020: Pohlmann und die Zeit der Wünsche
 2020: Kinder und andere Baustellen
 2021: An seiner Seite
 2021: Danish crime story: Rauhnächte (film series)
 2022: Nachricht von Mama (TV series)

References

External links 
 
 Marlene Morreis at Crew United.
 Marlene Morreis at filmportal.de
 Marlene Morreis at Agentur Rudorff
 Website of Marlene Morreis

Austrian film actresses
People from Schärding District
1976 births

Living people